The Royal Philharmonic Society has commissioned new works to composers since 1813. Most notable pieces commissioned by the Society are Beethoven's Symphony No. 9, Felix Mendelssohn's Symphony No.4 and Antonín Dvořák's Symphony No.8.

This is a list of compositions commissioned by the RPS or dedicated to the Royal Philharmonic Society (London) since 1813.

1814
 L. Berger: Overture
 Cherubini: Overture

1815
 Cherubini: Overture in G
 Cherubini: Symphony in D
 Ries: Symphony

1816
 Ries: Bardic Overture
 Klengel: Piano Quintet
 Potter: Overture
 Ries: Symphony No.3 in Eb
 Müller: Clarinet Quintet
 J. F. Burrowes: Overture
 Cherubini: Cantata La Primavera
 Clementi: Symphony
 Potter: Septet for piano, flute and strings
 Fémy: Symphony in E minor

1817
 Burghersh: Symphony

1819
 Ries: Scena Sia Luminosa

1821
 Spohr: Overture in F
 Bochsa: Septet for harp, wind and double bass

1825
 Beethoven: Symphony No.9

1832
 Neukomm: Septet (Fantasia Concertante) for wind and double bass
 Onslow: Symphony

1833
 Cramer: Piano Quintet in Bb
 Moscheles: Grand Septet for piano, strings, clarinet and horn
 Mendelssohn: Symphony No.4 in A (Italian)
 Hummel: Piano Concerto in F
 Neukomm: Fantasia Dramatica on Paradise Lost
 Potter: Symphony in A minor
 Mendelssohn: Trumpet Overture in C

1834
 H. R. Bishop: Cantata The Seventh Day
 Vincent Novello: Dramatic Cantata Rosalba
 Horsley: Motet Exultabo Te
 Mendelssohn: Concert Aria Infelice (op.94)

1835
 Herz: Piano Concerto in D minor

1836
 H. R. Bishop: Cantata The Departure from Paradise

1848
 Spohr: Symphony No.8 in G major

1862
 Bennett: Overture Paradise and the Peri

1864
 Bennett: Symphony in G minor

1867
 Sullivan: Overture Marmion

1868
 Barnett: Overture symphonique
 Benedict: Overture La selva incantata

1872
 Bennett: Prelude Ajax

1875
 Macfarren: Idyll in Memory of Sterndale Bennett

1881
 Cowen: Sinfonietta in A minor

1883
 King: Overture Among the Pines 

1885
 Mielck: Dramatische Ouverture
 Wingham: Serenade for Orchestra

1886
 Gadsby: Scene The Forest of Arden
 Saint-Saëns: Symphony No.3 in C "Organ"
 Moszkowski: Suite for orchestra

1887
 Corder: Suite Roumanian
 Randegger: Scena Prayer of Nature

1895
 Parry: Symphony No.3 in F (revised)

1896
 Dvořák: Five Biblical Songs with orchestra

1898
 MacCunn: Ballet music from Diarmid

1910
 Luigi Mancinelli: Romantic Overture

1917
 German: Song Have you news of my boy Jack?

1950
 Rawsthorne: Symphony

1958
Vaughan Williams: Symphony No.9

1963
 Walton: Variations on a Theme of Hindemith

1966
 Hoddinott: Variants for Orchestra

1969
 Musgrave: Clarinet Concerto

1970
 Lutosławski: Cello Concerto

1971
 Joubert: Symphony No.2

1975
 Cooke: Symphony No.4

1982
 Simpson: Symphony No.8

1985
 Musgrave and Bennett: Moving into Aquarius

1987
 Andrzej Panufnik: Symphony No.9
 Burgon: Song cycle Title Divine

1989
 Arnold: Cello Concerto

1992
 Saxton: Paraphrase on Mozart's Idomeneo

2000
 Jonathan Cole: Ouroboros

2001
 Luke Bedford: Five Abstracts, winner of the RPS Composition Prize
 Judith Bingham: Fifty Shades of GreenZ
 Burgon: Heavenly Things
 Simon Holt: Two Movements for String Quartet

2002
 Brett Dean: Huntington Eulogy
 John Woolrich: Darker Still 
 David Gorton: Oblique Prayers, winner of the RPS Composition Prize

2003
 Richard Rodney Bennett: Songs before Sleep
 Elliott Carter: Of Rewaking
 Jonathan Dove: Run to the Edge
 Detlev Glanert: Three Pieces
 David Lang: Breathless 
 John Hails: Lovesongs, winner of the RPS Composition Prize
 Leon Kirchner: Interlude II
 Simon Mawhinney: Darby's Loanin, winner of the RPS Composition Prize
 Julian Philips: Four Characters : Quattro Intermezzi 
 Karin Rehnqvist: Beginning 
 Augusta Read Thomas: Pulsar

2004
 : Symphonia for the London Sinfonietta, winner of the RPS Composition Prize
 Phillip Neil Martin: An Outburst of Time for the Cheltenham Festival, winner of the RPS Composition Prize
 Dai Fujikura: Be

2005
 Dai Fujikura: Another Place for the Cheltenham Festival, winner of the RPS Composition Prize
 Lyell Cresswell: Ara Kopikopiko, winner of the RPS Composition Prize

2006
 Hugh Wood: Wild Cyclamen, Op.49
 Emily Hall: My Dirty Little Heart, winner of the RPS Composition Prize
 Christopher Mayo: Passed the Last River, winner of the RPS Composition Prize
 Anders Nordentoft: Parasto
 Mark-Anthony Turnage: Two Baudelaire Songs
 Django Bates: Alison in Space
 Ian Wilson: Red Over Black
 Huw Watkins: Partita

2007
 Eleanor Alberga: Succubus Moon
 Dominick Argento: Three Sonnets of Petrarch
 Deirdre Gribbin: Calum's Light 
 Philippe Hersant: In Black 
 Mark Bowden, winner of the RPS Composition Prize
 Charlie Piper, winner of the RPS Composition Prize
 Stuart MacRae: Unity
 Joseph Phibbs: Flex
 Julian Philips: Four Characters

2008
 Cheryl Frances-Hoad: My Day in Hell, winner of the RPS Composition Prize
 Alexander Goehr: Since Brass, nor Stone...
 Dominic Muldowney: Tsunami
 Gwilym Simcock: Contours
 Tristan Rhys Williams: "Kapur", winner of the RPS Composition Prize

2009
 Dobrinka Tabakova: Suite in Jazz Style 
 Gwilym Simcock: Contours 
 Alexander Goehr: Since Brass, nor Stone
 Claudia Molitor: Alert
 Benjamin Cox: In Memoriam
 Evis Sammoutis: Night, again, winner of the RPS Composition Prize
 Sasha Siem: From the White Dictionary, winner of the RPS Composition Prize
 Tom Arthurs: And Distant Shore, winner of the RPS Composition Prize

2010
 Martin Suckling: To see the dark between (Aronowitz Ensemble, Wigmore Hall) - RPS Composition Prize
 Dimitris Economou: Metamorphosis (members of the Philharmonia, Patrick Bailey - conductor) - RPS Composition Prize
 Shiva Feshareki: out of sorts (members of the Philharmonia, Patrick Bailey - conductor) - RPS Composition Prize
 Michael Langemann: Epode for string quartet (Solstice Quartet, Cheltenham Music Festival) - RPS Composition Prize, supported by the Susan Bradshaw Composers' Fund
 Christian Mason: Looking for the Land that is Nowhere (Lydia Kavina, theramin, members of the Philharmonia, Patrick Bailey - conductor) - RPS Composition Prize

2011
 Dario Palermo: The Difference Engine (score for dance work, 12 October 2011) - RPS Drummond Fund
 Darren Bloom:: Three (Manus Noble - guitar) - RPS Composition Prize, supported by the Susan Bradshaw Composers' Fund
 Charlotte Bray: Replay (Festival Academy Soloists: Alexandra Wood - violin, Cian O’Duill - viola, Robin Michael - cello, Huw Watkins - piano, Cheltenham Festival) - RPS Composition Prize, supported by the Susan Bradshaw Composers' Fund
 Steven Daverson: Schattenwanderer (Mark van der Wiel - clarinet, members of the Philharmonia, Clark Rundell - conductor) - RPS Composition Prize
 Edward Nesbit: Concerto for violin and ensemble (Maya Iwabuchi - violin, members of the Philharmonia, Clark Rundell - conductor) - RPS Composition Prize
 Mark Simpson: Lethe (Byron Fulcher - trombone, members of the Philharmonia, Clark Rundell - conductor) - RPS Composition Prize

2012
 Stef Conner: Arranging Old Silks (Philharmonia MOT 2012) - RPS Composition Prize
 David Curington: Nine Accumulations (Philharmonia MOT 2012) - RPS Composition Prize
 Philip Dawson: Heath’s Contraption (Philharmonia MOT 2012) - RPS Composition Prize
 Lauri Supponen: The Dordrecht Humaphone (BBC Singers, Cheltenham Festival 2012) - RPS Composition Prize, supported by the Susan Bradshaw Composers' Fund
Tom Harrold Locked Horns (Total Brass, 17 May 2012)

2013
 Poul Ruders: String Quartet No 4 (Premiered at the Barbican centre by the Vertavo Quartet 9 March 2013)
 Jonathan Lloyd: Old Racket (for strings)
(Premiered on Friday 12 April 2013 at the Barbican Centre by the BBC Symphony Orchestra, conducted by Sir Andrew Davis)
 Jonathan Lloyd: New Balls (for winds)
(Premiered on Friday 17 May 2013 at the Barbican Centre by the BBC Symphony Orchestra, conducted by James Gaffigan)
 Judith Weir: I give you the end of a golden string (premiered on 8 June at the Aldeburgh Festival by Britten Sinfonia, conducted by Ryan Wigglesworth)
 Sally Beamish, Charlotte Bray, Anna Meredith, Thea Musgrave]]: Innocence and Experience (premiered on 9 June at the Aldeburgh Festival by the New London Children's Choir, conducted by Ronald Corp)
 Harrison Birtwistle: Songs from the Same Earth (premiered on 13 June by tenor Mark Padmore and pianist Andrew West)
 Julian Philips: Maxamorphosis (score for dance, May 2013) - RPS Drummond Fund
 Magnus Lindberg: Red House (premiered on 22 June at the Aldeburgh Festival by Birmingham Contemporary Music Group, conducted by Oliver Knussen)
 Wolfgang Rihm: A Tribute (Über die Linie VIII) (Halle Orchestra, conducted by Mark Elder)
 Kenneth Hesketh: Forms Entangled, Shapes Collided (score for dance work, Repetition of Change, February 2013) - RPS Drummond Fund
 Huw Watkins: Little Symphony (David Curtis, conductor; Orchestra of the Swan, 21 June 2013) - Composer in the House.
 Mark-Anthony Turnage: Frieze (RPS, BBC Radio 3 and New York Philharmonic co-commission - premiere: BBC Proms, 11 August 2013)
 Tom Coult: (Philharmonia MOT June 2013) - RPS Composition Prize
 Arne Gieshoff: Ad Bestias (Philharmonia MOT June 2013) - RPS Composition Prize
 Christopher McAteer: Casement (Philharmonia MOT June 2013) - RPS Composition Prize
 David Onac: String Quartet No.6 (Carducci Quartet, Cheltenham Music Festival) - RPS Composition Prize, supported by the Susan Bradshaw Composers' Fund
 Robert Peate: Pearl (Clare Hammond piano, Presteigne Festival 2013) - RPS Composition Prize, Presteigne Festival Alan Horne Memorial commission
 Bertie Baigent: Joie de Vivre (RPS Fanfare Commissions; brass players of the NYO, Mathew Coorey - conductor, 11 August 2013)
 Tom Harrold: Fanfaronade (RPS/IAMA Fanfare Commission; Buzz Brass, 7 November 2013)
 Benjamin Graves: Le Science de Monsieur Berlioz (Players from GSMD, 1 November 2013)
 Joshue Kaye: Le Science de Monsieur Berlioz (Players from GSMD, 1 November 2013)
 Ella Jarman-Pinto: Le Science de Monsieur Berlioz (Players from GSMD, 1 November 2013)
 Aled Smith: Uncertain Light (Alexandra Dariescu, piano, November 2013)

2014
 Matthew Kaner: Mosaic (Philharmonia MOT June 2014) - RPS Composition Prize
 Michael Cutting: I am a strange loop II (Philharmonia MOT June 2014) - RPS Composition Prize
 Samantha Fernando: Sense of Place (Philharmonia MOT June 2014) - RPS Composition Prize
 Daniel Kidane: Spear (Kate Romanom clarinet & Richard Uttley, piano, Presteigne Festival 2014) - RPS Composition Prize, Presteigne Festival Alan Horne Memorial commission
 Tom Stewart: Flying Kites Concentric Ceilings (Fidelio Trio, Cheltenham Festival 2014) - RPS Composition Prize, supported by the Susan Bradshaw Composers' Fund
 Dobrinka Tabakova PULSE (score for film in collaboration with film-maker Ruth Paxton, February 2014)
 Huw Watkins: Remember (Ruby Hughes, soprano; David Curtis, conductor and Orchestra of the Swan, 30 May 2014 Stratford-upon-Avon, Civic Hall) As part of Composer in the House.

2015
 Ed Scolding: Brut (in collaboration with Peter Groom; BFI Southbank, for SOUND:VISION)
 Dani Howard: Visions (in collaboration with Victoria Fiore; BFI Southbank, for SOUND:VISION)
 Joe Jackson: At First Sight (in collaboration with Chloe Wicks; BFI Southbank, for SOUND:VISION)
 Theo Vidgen: Swan Song for Four Cellos (in collaboration with Sophie Barrott; BFI Southbank, for SOUND:VISION)
 Sarah Lianne Lewis: Palimpsest (in collaboration with Christopher Lutterodt-Quarcoo; BFI Southbank, for SOUND:VISION)
 Huw Watkins: Envoi (Orchestra of the Swan, David Curtis - conductor, for Composer in the House)
 Nicholas Morrish: Abandonment and Ruin (Kokoro, for Cheltenham Music Festival) - RPS Composition Prize, supported by the Susan Bradshaw Composers' Fund
 Samuel Bordoli: As I Lay Dying (Philharmonia players, Royal Festival Hall) - RPS Composition Prize
 Oliver Leith: Craquelure (Philharmonia players, Royal Festival Hall) - RPS Composition Prize
 Nicholas Stuart: Very Small Symphony (Philharmonia players, Royal Festival Hall) - RPS Composition Prize
 Elizabeth Ogonek: Falling Up (Ensemble 360, Music in the Round) - RPS Composition Prize
 Michael Small: White Space(Fenella Humphreys - violin, for Presteigne Festival) - RPS Composition Prize
 Jonathan Dove: Nights Not Spent Alone (Kitty Whately - mezzo-soprano, Simon Lepper - piano, for Cheltenham Festival) - co-commission with BBC for New Generation Artists
 Elena Kats-Chernin: Material Men (Smith Quartet, Queen Elizabeth Hall) - RPS Drummond Fund commission
 Kerry Andrew: writing on the NHS (London Sinfonietta players, part of Southbank Centre's Notes to the New Government)
 Jordan Hunt: writing on the power of optimism (London Sinfonietta players, part of Southbank Centre's Notes to the New Government)
 Gavin Higgins: writing on the impact of the bedroom tax (London Sinfonietta players, part of Southbank Centre's Notes to the New Government)
 Benjamin Oliver and poet Luke Wright writing on loneliness and isolation (London Sinfonietta players, part of Southbank Centre's Notes to the New Government)
 Emma-Ruth Richards writing on sex trafficking (London Sinfonietta players, part of Southbank Centre's Notes to the New Government)
 Naomi Pinnock: Lines and Spaces (Richard Uttley - piano, Huddersfield Contemporary Music Festival)

2016
 John Casken: Serpents of Wisdom (Alec Frank-Gemmill - horn, Alasdair Beatson, piano, Wigmore Hall) - co-commission with BBC for New Generation Artists
 Julian Anderson: Incantesimi (Berlin Philharmoniker, Sir Simon Rattle - conductor)
 [[Patrick John Jones Locks of the Approaching Storm (Philharmonia players, Diego Masson - conductor, Royal Festival Hall) - RPS Composition Prize
 Desmond Clarke: Xyla (Philharmonia players, Diego Masson - conductor, Royal Festival Hall) - RPS Composition Prize
 Michael Taplin: Lambent Fires (Philharmonia players, Diego Masson - conductor, Royal Festival Hall) - RPS Composition Prize
 Kurt Schwertsik: Eine Windrose für Mauricio (Narek Hakhnazaryan - cello, Cheltenham Music Festival) - co-commission with BBC for New Generation Artists
 Hunter Coblentz: Trio (Fidelio Trio, Cheltenham Music Festival) - RPS Composition Prize, supported by the Susan Bradshaw Composers' Fund
 David Sawer: April \ March (London Sinfonietta, Andrew Gourlay - conductor, BBC Proms) - RPS Drummond Fund commission
 Rolf Wallin: (Danish String Quartet, Edinburgh International Festival) - co-commission with BBC for New Generation Artists
 Ninfea Cruttwell-Reade: Ravens' Cage (Emily Pailthorpe - clarinet, Clare Hammond, piano, for Presteigne Festival) - RPS Composition Prize
 Sally Beamish: Merula Perpetua (Lise Berthaud - viola, David Saudubray - piano, BBC Proms) - co-commission with BBC for New Generation Artists
 Dani Howard Ostara: (Ensemble 360, for Music in the Round) - RPS Composition Prize
 Francisco Coll: Chanson et Bagatelle (Peter Moore - trombone, Richard Uttley - piano) - co-commission with BBC for New Generation Artists
 Manfred Trojahn: Sonata V (Annelien Van Wauwe - clarinet, Nino Gvetadze - piano) - co-commission with BBC for New Generation Artists
 Johannes Fischer: Canons and Sparrows (Armida Quartet) - co-commission with BBC for New Generation Artists
 Michael Nyman: Two Sonnets for Sor Juana Inés de la Cruz (Kathryn Rudge - mezzo-soprano, James Baillieu - piano) - co-commission with BBC for New Generation Artists

References

 
Royal Philharmonic Society